Hamed Abdullah Al-Ghamdi (born April 2, 1999) is a Saudi Arabian professional footballer who currently plays as a midfielder for Pro League side Al-Ettifaq.

Honours

International
Saudi Arabia U20
 AFC U-19 Championship: 2018
Saudi Arabia U23
AFC U-23 Asian Cup: 2022

References

 

1999 births
Living people
Association football midfielders
People from Dammam
Saudi Arabian footballers
Saudi Arabia youth international footballers
Saudi Arabia international footballers
Ettifaq FC players
Saudi Professional League players